Hibbertia incurvata is a species of flowering plant in the family Dilleniaceae and is endemic to the Northern Territory. It is a spreading, woody shrub with scaly foliage, elliptic to lance-shaped leaves, and yellow flowers arranged in leaf axils with 28 to 35 stamens arranged in bundles around the two carpels.

Description

Taxonomy
Hibbertia incurvata was first formally described in 2010 by Hellmut R. Toelken in the Journal of the Adelaide Botanic Gardens from specimens collected near Maningrida in 2000. The specific epithet (incurvata) refers to the shape of the leaves.

Distribution and habitat
This hibbertia grows on or near sandstone outcrops and in open woodland in northern Arnhem Land.

Conservation status
Hibbertia incurvata is classified as "data deficient" under the Territory Parks and Wildlife Conservation Act 1976.

See also
List of Hibbertia species

References

incurvata
Flora of the Northern Territory
Plants described in 2010
Taxa named by Hellmut R. Toelken